Scopula callibotrys is a moth of the family Geometridae. It was described by Louis Beethoven Prout in 1918. It is found in the Democratic Republic of the Congo and Uganda.

References

Moths described in 1918
callibotrys
Insects of the Democratic Republic of the Congo
Insects of Uganda
Moths of Africa
Taxa named by Louis Beethoven Prout